Carbon Hill is a city in Walker County, Alabama, United States. It incorporated in February 1891. At the 2010 census the population was 2,021, down from 2,071 in 2000.

History
About 310 million years ago, Carbon Hill was located in a swampy area south of the equator. A number of important fossil discoveries and trackways have been located near Carbon Hill.

Carbon Hill, Alabama was settled in 1886 because of coal mining and the railroad. A post office was established in 1887 with John T. Anderson as the first Postmaster. By 1888, the community had grown enough to support the Carbon Hill United Methodist Church.

The Galloway Coal Company was responsible for the early development of Carbon Hill.  Col. Robert Galloway entered the coal and transfer business in 1863. On May 1, 1890 Galloway bought mines and property on Carbon Hill (as it was then called) from The Kansas City Coal and Coke Company for $130,000. Galloway turned the operation into a commercial success. Other mining companies set up operations after word spread of Galloway's success.

On February 1, 1891, the Sheriff of Walker County telegraphed the governor of Alabama requesting  fifty soldiers to be dispatched to Carbon Hill. Mayor Anderson wired: "There is a lawless mob here.  Colored people are shot and driven from home.  No arrest made.  We need troops." Superintendent B. W. Whitfield of the Carbon Hill Coal and Coke Company was anxious to fire 200 striking miners, and the men had caught word of it. The strikers feared the black citizens would take their jobs.

On February 14, 1891, the town of Carbon Hill was incorporated, with John T. Anderson as mayor. February 14 is also known as St. Valentine's Day; the founding fathers wanted the tiny town to be known as The Village of Love and Luck. The notion of coal as luck derives from the cultural traditions of Scotland (where Colonel Galloway was born) - it is also customary and considered lucky in Scotland and the North of England to give coal as a gift on New Year's Day. This occurs as part of First-Footing and represents warmth for the year to come.

On May 27, 1917, an F3 tornado hit Carbon Hill, killing 6 people and destroying 200 homes in an area 3 miles wide by 17 miles long.

Carbon Hill was "especially hard-hit by the Depression," and became known for its "savvy utilization of federal resources" provided by the Works Progress Administration (WPA) and the Public Works Administration (PWA). Residents used the funding to build a new high school, and made improvements to sewers, sidewalks, and streets.

On November 17, 1957 an F4 (max. wind speeds 207-260 mph) tornado 13.2 miles away from the Carbon Hill city center killed 4 people and injured 15 people.

An F3 tornado destroyed much of Carbon Hill on November 10, 2002.

An EF1 (max speeds 86-110 mph) tornado quickly passed through Carbon Hill on April 12, 2020, part of the 2020 Easter tornado outbreak. It remain on the ground for four minutes, traveling in a northeasterly direction and was 1,000 yards at its widest point. The tornado remained on the ground for 2.9 miles uprooting and snapping tree, destroying homes and other structures. This tornado was one of four that struck the Walker County on same day. No deaths or severe injuries were reported.

Mark Chambers controversies
Mark Chambers was appointed to the mayoralty in 2014. He won a full mayoral term in 2016. On June 5, 2019, Chambers made national news when local news outlet WBRC reported that Chambers made three public posts on Facebook with derogatory and threatening statements aimed at members of the LGBT community, including:

He also called immigrants "ungrateful" and initially denied writing the inflammatory social media post to a reporter.

Chambers later apologized for the posts, which were deleted, and in an interview with a local newspaper revealed having no intention to resign.

Following social media posts on June 25, 2020, by the Alabama Crimson Tide football team supportive of the Black Lives Matter movement, Chambers commented on Facebook, "I got several Alabama pictures for sale Nick Sabin (sic) and the Tide is done in my opinion... Their sorry ass political views is why their (sic) getting out of my house... When you put Black lives before all lives they can kiss my ass." By June 28, Chambers's comments had been deleted. He subsequently resigned from the mayoralty, and was replaced by councilor April Kennedy Herron.

Geography
Carbon Hill was begun as a small mining town in extreme western Walker County. The city is located at  (33.890690, -87.524307).

Climate
The climate in this area is characterized by hot, humid summers and generally mild to cool winters.  According to the Köppen Climate Classification system, Carbon Hill has a humid subtropical climate, abbreviated "Cfa" on climate maps.

Government
Carbon Hill has a six-member city council that is elected by geographic districts.

The town has a police department.

Demographics

2000 census
At the 2000 census there were 2,071 people in 880 households, including 579 families, in the city. The racial makeup of the city was 89.43% White, 8.74% Black or African American, 0.10% Native American, 0.29% from other races, and 1.45% from two or more races. 1.01% of the population were Hispanic or Latino of any race.
Of the 880 households 28.3% had children under the age of 18 living with them, 46.3% were married couples living together, 15.1% had a female householder with no husband present, and 34.2% were non-families. 31.9% of households were one person and 14.4% were one person aged 65 or older. The average household size was 2.28 and the average family size was 2.85.

The age distribution was 22.2% under the age of 18, 8.3% from 18 to 24, 24.2% from 25 to 44, 27.0% from 45 to 64, and 18.3% 65 or older. The median age was 41 years. For every 100 females, there were 81.7 males. For every 100 females age 18 and over, there were 77.1 males.
The median household income was $20,861 and the median family income  was $25,556. Males had a median income of $23,241 versus $15,170 for females. The per capita income for the city was $12,100. About 23.0% of families and 24.0% of the population were below the poverty line, including 30.7% of those under age 18 and 20.5% of those age 65 or over.

2010 census
At the 2010 census there were 2,021 people in 860 households, including 550 families, in the city. The racial makeup of the city was 89.4% White, 8.2% Black or African American, 0.2% Native American, 0.6% from other races, and 1.2% from two or more races. 1.2% of the population were Hispanic or Latino of any race.
Of the 860 households 25.7% had children under the age of 18 living with them, 41.4% were married couples living together, 17.0% had a female householder with no husband present, and 36.0% were non-families. 33.8% of households were one person and 15.8% were one person aged 65 or older. The average household size was 2.35 and the average family size was 2.97.

The age distribution was 23.7% under the age of 18, 7.4% from 18 to 24, 25.2% from 25 to 44, 26.4% from 45 to 64, and 17.3% 65 or older. The median age was 40.9 years. For every 100 females, there were 90.3 males. For every 100 females age 18 and over, there were 90.6 males.

The median household income was $25,481 and the median family income  was $36,298. Males had a median income of $32,455 versus $25,417 for females. The per capita income for the city was $15,167. About 24.6% of families and 26.2% of the population were below the poverty line, including 44.0% of those under age 18 and 27.9% of those age 65 or over.

2020 census

As of the 2020 United States census, there were 1,769 people, 622 households, and 364 families residing in the city.

Churches
Carbon Hill is known for its vast selection of Christian Churches in the city. There were approximately thirty churches in the city as of 2011. Two of the town's churches, the Carbon Hill Church of God of Prophecy, and the Carbon Hill First Baptist gained national attention from the media during the destruction of the 2002 tornadoes. The Church of God of Prophecy was a temporary housing and safe unit during the catastrophe, under direction of the American Red Cross and the Southern Baptist Association.

Notable people
Ken Guin, Member of Alabama House of Representatives from 1994 to 2010, House Majority Leader 1997 to 2010.
Buddy Nix, Buffalo Bills General Manager from 2010 to 2013.
Joseph Sam Perry, federal judge on the United States District Court for the Northern District of Illinois from 1951 to 1971.
Wimp Sanderson, college basketball coach and former basketball coach at Carbon Hill High School.
Elmer Tutwiler, Former baseball player for the Pittsburgh Pirates.

Education
This town is served by Carbon Hill High School, a facility of 430 students in grades 9-12. The school is known as the first place of employment for college basketball coach "Wimp" Sanderson, and home to many collegiate football players.  The school's mascot is the Bulldog, and the colors are blue and white. The school is a member of the Walker County Board of Education. In 2002, the original school building was destroyed by fire. It was recently replaced by a new building. Carbon Hill Elementary/Junior High School which some of the students were temporarily relocated was destroyed by an F3 tornado that destroyed much of Carbon Hill on November 10, 2002.

References

Cities in Alabama
Cities in Walker County, Alabama
Birmingham metropolitan area, Alabama